Vogelaar is a Dutch occupational surname meaning "bird catcher". It is equivalent to the English surname Fowler.  Notable people with the surname include:

Carel de Vogelaer (1653–1695), Dutch still life painter
Ella Vogelaar (born 1949), Dutch politician, minister of Integration and Housing  2007–08
Jacq Firmin Vogelaar (born 1944), pseudonym of the Dutch writer Frans Broers
Kate Vogelaar, Irish model

See also
Vogler and Vogeler, German forms of the surname
Reinhilde Veugelers (born 1963), Belgian economist with a dialectical form of the name

References

Dutch-language surnames
Occupational surnames